|}

The Prix Daniel Wildenstein is a Group 2 flat horse race in France open to thoroughbreds aged three years or older. It is run at Longchamp over a distance of 1,600 metres (about 1 mile), and it is scheduled to take place each year in late September or early October.

History
The event was established in 1882, and it was originally called the Prix du Rond Point. It was initially run over 2,200 metres, and was cut to 2,000 metres in 1891. It was extended to 2,100 metres in 1903, and reverted to 2,000 metres in 1909.

The race was abandoned throughout World War I, with no running from 1914 to 1919. It was shortened to 1,600 metres in 1921, and increased to 1,700 metres in 1922.

The Prix du Rond Point was cancelled twice during World War II, in 1939 and 1940. It was held at Maisons-Laffitte in 1943, and Le Tremblay in 1944.

The distance was cut to 1,600 metres in 1953, and it returned to 1,700 metres in 1958. It was set at 1,400 metres in 1959, and restored to 1,600 metres in 1969.

The present system of race grading was introduced in 1971, and the Prix du Rond Point was classed at Group 3 level. For a period it took place in early September, and it was switched to late September in 1980.

The event was added to the two-day Prix de l'Arc de Triomphe meeting in 1987. For several years it was staged on the same day as the Arc, the first Sunday in October. It was promoted to Group 2 status in 1990, and moved to the Saturday of the meeting in 2001.

The race was renamed in memory of Daniel Wildenstein (1917–2001), a leading racehorse owner and breeder, in 2002.

Records
Most successful horse (2 wins):
 Cameleon – 1889, 1890
 Le Meridional – 1955, 1957
 Special Kaldoun – 2003, 2005
 Spirito del Vento – 2007, 2008
 Taareef – 2016, 2017
 The Revenant - 2019, 2020

Leading jockey (5 wins):
 Yves Saint-Martin – Embellie (1965), Rockcress (1969), Prince Jet (1970), Faraway Son (1971), Monsanto (1976)
 Frankie Dettori – Decorated Hero (1997), Fly to the Stars (1998), Kabool (2000), China Visit (2001), Echo of Light (2006)
 Olivier Peslier – Spirito del Vento (2007, 2008), Royal Bench (2010), Solow (2014), Impassable (2015)

Leading trainer (4 wins):
 Richard Count – Champosoult (1894), Estragon (1896), Capo d'Istria (1897), Gorenflot (1898)
 Saeed bin Suroor – Fly to the Stars (1998), Kabool (2000), China Visit (2001), Echo of Light (2006)

Leading owner (4 wins):
 Emile Deschamps – Champosoult (1894), Estragon (1896), Gorenflot (1898), Vangoyen (1913)
 Godolphin – Fly to the Stars (1998), Kabool (2000), China Visit (2001), Echo of Light (2006)

Winners since 1978

Earlier winners

 1882: Integre
 1883: Precy
 1884: Mahmoud
 1885:
 1886: Jaguar / Souci
 1887:
 1888: Halbran
 1889: Cameleon
 1890: Cameleon
 1891:
 1892: Cigare
 1893:
 1894: Champosoult
 1895: Gibraltar
 1896: Estragon
 1897: Capo d'Istria
 1898: Gorenflot
 1899:
 1900: Kiss
 1901: Abdy
 1902: Marechal Niel
 1903:
 1904: Xenophon
 1905: Amalecite
 1906: Le Horo
 1907: Elysee
 1908: Pyreneen
 1909: Lezard
 1910: Canteloup
 1911: Joyeux
 1912: Hargicourt
 1913: Vangoyen
 1914–19: no race
 1920: Mounbeou
 1921: Marvel
 1922: Select
 1923: Dauphin
 1924: El Paso
 1925: Condover
 1926: Pacific
 1927: Cosquillosa
 1928: La Moqueuse
 1929: Mysarch
 1930: Ultra Violet
 1931: Campra
 1932: Angelico
 1933: Relique
 1934: Rarity
 1935: Tracias
 1936: Sanguinetto
 1937: Aurangzeb
 1938: Saint Preux
 1939–40: no race
 1941: Treacle
 1942: Puymirol
 1943: Mitchouby
 1944: Nonant le Pin
 1945: Epi d'Or
 1946:
 1947: Adios
 1948: Clarion
 1949:
 1950: Bunker
 1951: Eppi d'Or
 1952: Ksarinor
 1953: Fine Top
 1954: Jolly Friar
 1955: Le Meridional
 1956: Le Mioche
 1957: Le Meridional
 1958: Tangation
 1959: Petite Caille
 1960: Mienne
 1961:
 1962: Phaleron
 1963: Aquilla
 1964: Musical
 1965: Embellie
 1966: Canadel
 1967: Lemmy
 1968: Montevideo
 1969: Rockcress
 1970: Prince Jet
 1971: Faraway Son
 1972: Daring Display
 1973: Princess Arjumand
 1974: Nonoalco
 1975: Delmora
 1976: Monsanto
 1977: Pharly

See also
 List of French flat horse races
 Recurring sporting events established in 1882  – this race is included under its original title, Prix du Rond Point.

References

 France Galop / Racing Post:
 galop.courses-france.com:
 1882–1889, 1890–1919, 1920–1949, 1950–1979, 1980–present

 france-galop.com – A Brief History: Prix Daniel Wildenstein.
 galopp-sieger.de – Prix Daniel Wildenstein (ex Prix du Rond Point).
 horseracingintfed.com – International Federation of Horseracing Authorities – Prix Daniel Wildenstein (2018).
 pedigreequery.com – Prix Daniel Wildenstein – Longchamp.

Open mile category horse races
Longchamp Racecourse
Horse races in France

1882 establishments in France